Labuan Bajo is a fishing town located at the western end of the large island of Flores in the Nusa Tenggara region of east Indonesia. It is the capital of the West Manggarai Regency (Kabupaten Manggarai Barat), one of the eight regencies which are the major administrative divisions of Flores.

Tourism

Once a small fishing village, Labuan Bajo (also spelled Labuhanbajo and Labuanbajo) is now a tourist center as well as a centre of government for the surrounding region. Facilities to support tourist activities are expanding quickly although the rapid rise in the numbers of visitors is imposing some strains on the local environment.

Komodo National Park 
Labuan Bajo is the gateway for trips across the nearby Komodo National Park to Komodo Island and Rinca Island, both home to the famous Komodo dragons.The islands in Labuan Bajo have a very beautiful natural charm, one of which is a water destination that has underwater views with a variety of charming marine life. There are numerous snorkeling points in the islands close to Labuan Bajo.  Kanawa and Seraya Islands, for example, offer good diving and snorkeling sites.  Currents can be strong at some sites however so care is needed. Every evening at Kalong Island, to the south of Labuan Bajo, thousands of flying fox bats (known as burung kalong in Indonesian) provide an amazing display. Around dusk the bats rise up from the mangroves around Kalong Island and within a few minutes, a column begins to form as thousands of bats begin to traverse across to the main island of Flores to the east.  More and more bats join the column for perhaps the next 30 mins or so.  The column soon forms into a remarkable trail across the sky stretching for miles as the bats fly east to Flores to search for food in the nearby forests.

Environmental Tourism 
Other features nearby to Labuan Bajo include several waterfalls, trekking facilities, and many diverse beaches. The town is quite small and can easily be traversed on foot in 15 minutes or so.   

Mirror stone cave (Batu cermin cave) is only 4 km away.   

Another place that is not so popular, but it is worth coming is called Wae Rebo Village. To get to Wae Rebo,  it requires seven hours drive and the village is known with their traditional house called Mbaru Niang.

Other Tourist Information 

There are various interesting churches and a mosque. There are numerous ATMs around the town and the main roads are paved.

Heading east from Labuan Bajo, one can travel by road to other towns across Flores such as Ruteng, Bajawa, Ende and Maumere.

Tourism Development 
In Labuan Bajo, tourism development has had a great impact on the economy by creating job opportunities for the locals population and increasing revenue in the area. Total accommodations has also increased in the area.  In 2019, the area included 13 five-star hotels, 68 non-star hotels, 4 villas, and 26 dormitories.

Transport

Komodo Airport is located just 2 km from the center of Labuan Bajo and has 4-6 daily flights arriving from Bali and elsewhere. Labuan Bajo port has daily ferry departures to the town of Bima to the west on the large island of Sumbawa and weekly or bi-weekly departures to Denpasar and Sulawesi. There are also direct flights from Jakarta to Labuan Bajo by Garuda Indonesia and Batik Air.

Economy 
The local economy in the town is centred around the ferry port and tourism, local shops and restaurants, and the diving trade. Most of the foreign tourists are European, many from Italy, and also from Australia and the United Kingdom. The wider area produces fish and palm oil; there is also a large amount of subsistence agriculture in the villages in the region where living standards are still low.  Levels of poverty in the rural areas are high.

The national and regional governments both made 2012 a year to promote the regional tourism around Labuan Bajo and the nearby Komodo National Park with a six month long festival from July until December 2012.

Climate
Labuan Bajo has a tropical savanna climate (Aw) with moderate to little rainfall from April to November and heavy rainfall from December to March.

Gallery

References

External links

 
 Labuan Bajo information
 Labuan Bajo Article

Populated places in East Nusa Tenggara
Regency seats of East Nusa Tenggara
Flores Island (Indonesia)